Donatas Montvydas (born 22 October 1987), better known by his stage name Donny Montell, is a Lithuanian singer-songwriter who represented Lithuania at the Eurovision Song Contest 2012, held in Baku, Azerbaijan. He did so for a second time in 2016, when he represented his country in Stockholm, Sweden.

Early life
Donatas Montvydas was born in Vilnius. His mother was a gymnast and his father was a drummer of the hard rock group Plackartas. Montvydas' older sister is a professional dancer. His interest in music began at a young age. He started performing publicly at age six when his vocal teacher let him participate in the contest for young singers “Dainų dainelė” (“The song of the Songs”), singing " Aš kiškelis mažas“ and he became a laureate. In 2008 he won his first big prize when becoming the Grand Prix winner of the International Festival of Arts Slavianski Bazaar in Vitebsk, Belarus.

Musical influences
As a child, Montvydas was highly influenced by artists such as Michael Jackson and rock band Queen and would often impersonate these artists from a young age. He also admires Freddie Mercury for his personality. Montvydas also stated that his father is by far his biggest inspiration.

Eurovision Song Contest

Filmography

Television

Discography

Studio albums

EPs

Singles

References

External links

 Official Facebook page

Living people
21st-century Lithuanian male singers
Eurovision Song Contest entrants for Lithuania
Dancing with the Stars winners
Musicians from Vilnius
1987 births
English-language singers from Lithuania
Eurovision Song Contest entrants of 2016
Eurovision Song Contest entrants of 2012
Slavianski Bazaar winners